Audea subligata is a species of moth in the family Erebidae first described by William Lucas Distant in 1902. It is found in Botswana, South Africa (Mpumalanga) and Tanzania.

References

Moths described in 1902
Audea
Moths of Africa